Svenska dialektmysterier is a Swedish television series about Swedish dialects. It was hosted by Fredrik Lindström and produced by Marcos Hellberg and broadcast on SVT2 in January 2006–May 2012. The programme can be seen as a continuation of Värsta språket, another series hosted by Lindström. It won the television award Kristallen in the infotainment category.

Episodes

First Season (2006)

Second Season (2012)

External links
Official site

Sveriges Television original programming
Swedish documentary television series